Walter Matthew Wilson (born January 11, 1984) is an American politician and lawyer from Brookhaven, Georgia who served as the Georgia State Representative for the 80th district. A member of the Democratic Party, he defeated Republican incumbent Meagan Hanson in November 2018. Wilson is only the second openly gay man to be elected to the Georgia legislature.

Wilson ran in the 2022 Democratic primary for Georgia's Insurance and Fire commissioner, losing to Janice Laws Robinson in a runoff. He was one of two openly-LGBT primary candidates in the 2022 Democratic primaries for state executive office, alongside Renitta Shannon who ran for Lieutenant Governor. He was succeeded in the House by Long Tran.

Early life and education
Wilson and his twin sister were raised in Griffin, Georgia. He holds a Bachelor's degree and a Juris Doctor from University of Georgia.

Following graduation from college, he participated in the national Teach For America program, teaching sixth-grade math and science at a low-income, inner-city school in Houston, Texas.

Wilson is a partner with the law firm of Akin & Tate, where he is a general practice litigator.

Political career
Wilson had his first political experience working as a staffer on the 2010 gubernatorial campaign of former Georgia Governor Roy Barnes. He also served briefly as the legislative director for the State Bar of Georgia.

He was elected to the Georgia House of Representatives in 2018 after defeating Republican incumbent Meagan Hanson. Sean Meloy of LGBTQ Victory Fund described District 80 as "one of the most competitive in the entire state." President Barack Obama endorsed Wilson.

Wilson was re-elected to a second term in the state house on November 3, 2020, defeating Republican challenger Alan Cole.

Electoral history

2018

2020

References

External links
 Official Georgia House of Representatives page
 Official campaign website

Democratic Party members of the Georgia House of Representatives
LGBT state legislators in Georgia (U.S. state)
Politicians from Atlanta
21st-century American politicians
Living people
Georgia (U.S. state) lawyers
University of Georgia alumni
University of Georgia School of Law alumni
Gay politicians
1984 births
Teach For America alumni